Alan Lofthouse is a former South African international lawn and indoor bowler.

He won a gold medal in the fours at the 1994 Commonwealth Games in Victoria with Robert Rayfield, Donald Piketh and Neil Burkett.

In November 2014, Alan Lofthouse and Geoff Perrow won the Western Province pairs.

References

External links 
 

Living people
South African male bowls players
Commonwealth Games gold medallists for South Africa
Commonwealth Games medallists in lawn bowls
Bowls players at the 1994 Commonwealth Games
Year of birth missing (living people)
Medallists at the 1994 Commonwealth Games